Lahdenpohja (Finnish and Swedish: Lahdenpohja) is a town and the administrative center of Lakhdenpokhsky District of the Republic of Karelia, Russia, located  west of Petrozavodsk on the Aurajoki River. Population:

History

Lahdenpohja literally means "bay's bottom". It has been a marketplace since the 17th century, located on an old trade route going as far as Oulu. It was mentioned in 1638 as Lahen Pohia, reflecting the local pronunciation of lahden (genitive case form of lahti, bay) as lahen. It was a part of the Jaakkima parish until 1924, when Lahdenpohja was separated from it as a kauppala. The locals also called it Lopotti, a Russian loanword (see sloboda) referring to a built-up area smaller than a town. Lahdenpohja was ceded to the Soviet Union after the Winter and Continuation Wars. Lakhdenpokhya is simply an alternate romanization of Лахденпохья, the Russian transcription of the Finnish name.
 
Town status was granted to it in 1945.

Administrative and municipal status
Within the framework of administrative divisions, Lakhdenpokhya serves as the administrative center of Lakhdenpokhsky District, to which it is directly subordinated. As a municipal division, the town of Lakhdenpokhya, together with the station of Yakkima, is incorporated within Lakhdenpokhsky Municipal District as Lakhdenpokhskoye Urban Settlement.

Transportation
The town serves as a railway station on the Vyborg–Joensuu railway.

References

Notes

Sources

Cities and towns in the Republic of Karelia
Lakhdenpokhsky District
Former municipalities of Finland